Carmouche is a surname. Notable people with the surname include:

Edward M. Carmouche (1921–1990), American attorney and politician
Liz Carmouche (born 1984), American mixed martial arts fighter 
Paul Carmouche (born 1943), American lawyer
Pierre Carmouche (1797–1868), French playwright and chansonnier